The Aransas River is a short river in south Texas in the United States. It drains an area of the south Texas coastal plains into the Gulf of Mexico. It rises in Bee County southwest of Beeville and north of Skidmore, from the confluence of three creeks: Olmos, Aransas, and Poesta.

For some of the period when Texas was a state in Mexico, the Aransas formed the southwestern boundary, separating it from the neighboring Mexican state of Coahuila.

There's good fishing in this river in Woodsboro.

See also
List of rivers of Texas
Aransas Bay
Aransas County, Texas
Aransas Pass, Texas

External links 
 

Rivers of Texas
Bodies of water of Bee County, Texas
Rivers of Refugio County, Texas
Bodies of water of Aransas County, Texas